Ana Revenco (born 21 May 1977) is a Moldovan politician. She serves as Minister of Internal Affairs  in the cabinet of Prime Minister Natalia Gavrilița.

References 

Living people
1977 births
Place of birth missing (living people)
Moldovan Ministers of the Interior
21st-century Moldovan politicians
21st-century Moldovan women politicians
Women government ministers of Moldova